Abd-Allah ibn Abd-Allah ibn Ubayy was the son of Abd-Allah ibn Ubayy and a companion of Muhammad. In contrast to his father, who is considered a munafiq by Muslims, he is well regarded by Shi'a Muslims.

He appears in 627, when both father and son participated in a preemptive raid against the Banu Mustaliq. When Abd-Allah's father voiced his discontent about the behaviour of the Muhajirun and this was reported to Muhammad, Umar advised Muhammad to have Ibn Ubayy killed. Reportedly, Abd-Allah volunteered for this deed, but Muhammad would not allow it.

See also
Sunni view of the Sahaba

References

Companions of the Prophet